Noropithecus is an extinct Old World monkey uncovered from the Early Miocene formations of Buluk, Kenya. It is known from a fragment of a right mandible. It is believed to have been arboreal and omnivorous.

References

Old World monkeys
Prehistoric monkeys
Prehistoric primate genera
Fossil taxa described in 2009
Miocene mammals of Africa
Miocene primates of Africa